Ali bin al-Mugrab Al Uyuni (علي بن المقرب العيوني) was a Bahrani poet from Al-Hasa, who died in 630 AH or 1232 AD, one of the late known poets among the people of the Arabian Peninsula before the modern era. Percentage due to Al Uyuni built from Abdul Qays, who ruled Ahsa in that period after extracted from Qarmatians. Al Uyuni poet, and is considered his office and explanations which are attached by one of the most important sources on the history of that state.

This has been achieved by his several times of poetry, by a number of researchers, including Ahmed Musa al-Khatib and new investigations and explanation. by three researchers (Abdul-Khaliq al-Janabi, Abdul Ghani Alarafat, and Ali Bey).

See also
 Rabi'ah
 Uyunid dynasty

References

13th-century Arabs
Uyunid dynasty